SS Sachem may refer to one of two Type T3-S-A1 tankers built for the United States Maritime Commission by Bethlehem Sparrows Point Shipyard:

  (MC hull number 517), became USS Enoree (AO-69); placed in National Defense Reserve Fleet in 1958; scrapped in 1976
  (MC hull number 523), scrapped in 1964

or to:

, passenger ship built by Harland and Wolff for Geo Warren & Co and completed on 28 October 1893

Ship names